Heilwig Jacob (born 4 July 1942) is a German sprinter. She competed in the women's 100 metres at the 1964 Summer Olympics.

References

1942 births
Living people
Athletes (track and field) at the 1964 Summer Olympics
German female sprinters
Olympic athletes of the United Team of Germany
Sportspeople from Lubusz Voivodeship
People from Żary
Olympic female sprinters